Gatton may refer to:

Places
Gatton, Queensland, Australia
Shire of Gatton, former administrative region
Gatton, Surrey, former village in England
 Gatton (UK Parliament constituency), rotten borough based in the village

People
Gatton (family), Norman land-owning dynasty in Southern England
Danny Gatton (1945–1994), American guitarist

Education
Gatton College of Business and Economics, University of Kentucky
Carol Martin Gatton Academy of Mathematics and Science in Kentucky or "Gatton Academy"